Donald Bartlett "Don" Reid (30 June 1926 – 11 August 2001) was Mayor of Ottawa, Ontario from 1965 to 1969.

Reid was first elected to office in the 1954 municipal election as the alderman for Ward 4. At the time he was the general manager of Reid's Furniture and Appliances, attended Westboro United Church, was a member of the Kinsmen Club, was president of the Junior Board of Trade, and the Ottawa Radio, TV and Appliance Deals Association, and had previously been a director of the Central Canada Exhibition Association. He lived at 224 Bank Street. 

Reid won a spot on Ottawa's Board of Control in the 1960 municipal election.  At the time he was still operating his furniture store, and had also been a director of the Ottawa Winter Fair. He owned a farm in Osgoode, Ontario where he raised Shetland ponies and beef cattle. He lived with his family at 474 Picadilly Avenue near Island Park Drive.

Reid was elected as mayor of Ottawa in the 1964 mayoral election, defeating Charlotte Whitton. As mayor, he helped get the Children's Hospital of Eastern Ontario started, announced the building of the Ottawa Civic Centre. Reid served as mayor for four years. He re-entered politics in 1975, returning to the Board of Control until 1980, when he was elected for one term as alderman for Richmond Ward. After retiring from politics, he continued to serve on the board of the Central Canada Exhibition until 1992. He then turned his farm in Osgoode into a subdivision called Fairfield Estates. 

In terms of partisan politics, Reid was noted as being a member of the Confederation Club, a Conservative Party organization earlier in his life, but had switched to being a Liberal before 1964. 

Reid died at the Ottawa Heart Institute aged 75, leaving behind his wife Jean (née Armstrong) and five children.

References

1926 births
2001 deaths
Mayors of Ottawa
Ottawa city councillors
Ottawa controllers
Members of the United Church of Canada
Businesspeople from Ottawa